The second season of the ABC American television drama series Revenge started on September 30, 2012 on Sundays. An hour long recap show of the first season called "The First Chapter" was shown the week before the premiere on September 26, 2012 at 9:00 pm Eastern / 8:00 pm Central. The series stars Madeleine Stowe and Emily VanCamp. The season premiere received mixed response from critics, with many praising the acting while criticizing the plot, saying that it didn't live up to the suspense of the first season. Reviews did improve as the season progressed.

Cast

Main 
 Madeleine Stowe as Victoria Grayson
 Emily VanCamp as Emily Thorne
 Gabriel Mann as Nolan Ross
 Henry Czerny as Conrad Grayson
 Ashley Madekwe as Ashley Davenport
 Nick Wechsler as Jack Porter
 Josh Bowman as Daniel Grayson
 Barry Sloane as Aiden Mathis
 Christa B. Allen as Charlotte Grayson
 Connor Paolo as Declan Porter

Recurring 
 Margarita Levieva as Amanda Clarke
 Dilshad Vadsaria as Padma Lahari
 J.R. Bourne as Kenny Ryan
 Wendy Crewson as Helen Crowley
 Michael Trucco as Nate Ryan
 Jennifer Jason Leigh as Kara Clarke-Murphy
 Cary-Hiroyuki Tagawa as Satoshi Takeda
 E.J. Bonilla as Marco Romero
 James Tupper as David Clarke
 James Morrison as Gordon Murphy
 Roger Bart as Mason Treadwell
 Seychelle Gabriel as Regina George
 Burn Gorman as Trask
 Jonathan Adams as Matt Duncan
 Emily Alyn Lind as 10-year-old Amanda Clarke
 Collins Pennie as Eli James

Guest 
 Todd Grinnell as Dr. Thomas
 Dylan Walsh as Jason Prosser
 Susan Park as Edith Long / "the Falcon"
 Jessica Tuck as Allison Stoddard
 Adrienne Barbeau as Marion Harper
 Joaquim de Almeida as Salvador Grobet
 Juju Chang as herself
 Clare Carey as Patricia Barnes
 Geoff Pierson as Robert Barnes

Notes

Episodes

Ratings 

Season 2 (Live+7)

References

External links 
 
 

Season 1
2012 American television seasons
2013 American television seasons